The Russian-Belarusian border is the state border between Russia and Belarus. Prior to 1991, it was the border between the Russian Soviet Federative Socialist Republic and the Byelorussian Soviet Socialist Republic. The border formally exists, but is not subject to customs checks or duty due to the Union State treaty and the Eurasian Union.

History
The border between the Republic of Belarus and the Russian Federation was formally formed after the dissolution of the Soviet Union in December 1991. In May 1995, Alexander Lukashenko and then-Russian Prime Minister Viktor Chernomyrdin dug up a symbolic border post in the Smolensk Oblast on the border between the two countries, although the border guard agencies remained stationed in Pskov and Smolensk, and in Brest, Belarus there were commandant's offices that carried out operational cover of external borders.

In June 2009, Belarus established customs posts and sent customs officers to the border because of the Milk War. Belarus withdrew the officers and dismantled the posts at the end of the month once the dispute was resolved.

On 1 April 2011 officially, custom control at the border was abolished. In accordance with the agreement, if the Belarusian transport authorities detect irregularities in the controlled parameters of a vehicle, the absence of necessary documents or irregularities in the documents, they issue the driver a notice of the deficiencies identified and advise them on the documents to be obtained before arriving in the territory of the other side. They also advise a carrier on the checkpoints on the other side, considering the route of a carrier, where a carrier must present proof that the discrepancies in controlled parameters of the vehicle have been addressed, and the documents specified in the notice. After receiving such a notice, a carrier must obtain confirmation at the Russian checkpoint that the irregularities have been removed. The vehicle can leave the territory of the Union State only after the carrier presents the notice with the Russian conformation.

In April 2012, the Border Committee of Belarus and Russia held a meeting in Hrodna. At the meeting, Grigory Rapota, state secretary of the Belarusian-Russian Union State, said that 2,857 million Russian roubles had been provided for the project out of the Union State budget. The money was spent, among other things, on the purchase of two helicopters for Belarusian border control units and the further training of Belarusian border guards in Russia.

There is virtually no border control when travelling between Russia and Belarus, but since October 2016, document checks and prohibitions against third-country nationals have been instituted by Russia when travelling from Belarus to Russia by road, as it is prohibited by Russian law for third-country national to enter Russia outside border control, and there is no border control on the open border. Visitors are advised by the Polish Embassy in Belarus to enter mainland Russia via Terehova (Latvia)–Burachki or Senkivka (Ukraine)–Novye Yurkovichi.

Air travel between Belarus and Russia was treated as domestic and did not incur border controls before May 2017 (but there are identity checks as exist for normal domestic air travel in Russia and Belarus), since then, the flights have been treated as international by Russia and a full border check is done on third-country nationals by Russia, though no formal border check aside from a simple identity check is applied on Russian and Belorussian citizens.

On 16 March 2020, Russia decided to close its border with Belarus due to the coronavirus outbreak.

On July 29, 2020, State Secretary of the Security Council of the Republic of Belarus A.A. Ravkov stated that Belarus will significantly strengthen the operational cover of the state border, “including the border with the Russian Federation as part of studying the situation, tracking persons who cross the state border, including on the green border ”.

On July 31, 2020, additional forces of the FSB border service were pulled to the border from the Russian side, and the Border Directorate of the Russian Federal Security Service for the Smolensk Region received an order to record the data of Belarusian citizens moving in both directions.

References

External links
Moscow erects border with Belarus, undermines its links with Ukraine and the Baltics Belarus Digest

 
1991 establishments in Belarus
1991 establishments in Russia
1991 in international relations
Borders of Russia
Internal borders of the Soviet Union
Belarus–Russia relations
Borders of Belarus
International borders